Arturo Peniche (born Arturo Delgadillo Peniche on May 17, 1962) is a Mexican telenovela actor who became popular in Latin America during the 1990s. He is the brother of actor Flavio Peniche, who appears in the telenovela La Traición.

Biography
Peniche struggled as an actor for many years before reaching stardom. Although he graduated from the famous Televisa school of actors, he found himself competing against other figures such as Guillermo Capetillo, Andrés García, Jaime Garza and Salvador Pineda, among others.

Peniche acted in several commercials during that period, experience that would later on help him land top roles at Televisa's telenovelas. One commercial, in which he sells bracelets with supposedly special powers made him somewhat famous in Puerto Rico and other parts of Latin America.

His real break, however, came in 1990, when he filmed a telenovela named Emperatriz in Venezuela and later shot María María, his only soap as the male lead in the country. Having gained extreme popularity there, Peniche returned to Mexico with a new contract by Televisa. In 1991, he played the male antagonist in Valeria y Maximiliano, his first successful soap opera in his home country.

His fame increased in 1992 when he participated in Maria Mercedes, a soap opera which was a huge international hit and launched the career of Thalía. After Maria Mercedes, Peniche took a break from filming telenovelas because his fame had reached levels that he didn't expect. However, he was still constantly on the public eye, thanks in part to magazines such as TV Novelas and others.

In 1995, he returned, filming a soap named Morelia, which was co-produced by Univision and Televisa. Parts of Morelia were filmed in the United States, and it was also a public favorite. For the next several years, he continued to make major international hits such as La usurpadora and La Intrusa with Venezuelan actress Gaby Spanic, and Siempre te Amare, among others. Contrary to the first time that he became famous, Peniche felt more mature and comfortable with fame after his comeback; this helped him continue on landing top roles at Televisa's main soaps.

In 2004, Arturo joins the cast of the telenovela Corazones al Limite, produced by Nicandro Diaz Gonzalez and Roberto Hernandez. In 2005 he was invited to participate in the thick and thin telenovela produced by Nicandro Diaz González in which Nazario plays. That same year he plays 'Antonio' in Alborada, a telenovela produced by Carla Estrada, with Lucero and Fernando Colunga.

In 2007 plays the 'Governor Fernando Sánchez de Moncada' in Zorro, la espada y la rosa, the first adaptation of telenovela Zorro legend and the first Spanish version. This telenovela is starring Christian Meier and Marlene Favela. Then he joined the filming Victoria, telenovela starring alongside Victoria Ruffo and Mauricio Ochmann.

Participated in the soap El Nombre del amor with Victoria Ruffo, Leticia Calderon, Laura Flores, among others. In 2010 he participated in the soap opera Nina de mi corazon where he plays Max and shares credits with Maribel Guardia, Erick Elias, Paulina Goto, among others.

In 2010 and 2011 participated in Cuando me enamoro soap opera with Silvia Navarro and Juan Soler. In 2012-13 he's back in soap opera, Qué bonito amor, plays the part Fernando Beltran "El Mil Amores" with Danna García, Jorge Salinas, Pablo Montero, Juan Ferrara, Victor Norigea, Malliany Marin and Karla Alvarez, among others. In 2013 it makes a special participation in the soap opera La tempestad with William Levy, Ximena Navarrete, Nora Salinas and Maria Sorte. In 2014 co-starring in his first comedic soap opera Qué pobres tan ricos, which gives life to Nepomuceno, a comic character who is far from his previous characters in his melodramas. This time he shares credit beside Zuria Vega, Jaime Camil, Manuel "Flaco" Ibáñez, Sylvia Pasquel, Mark Tacher and Ingrid Martz. Later he participated in the soap opera La malquerida with Victoria Ruffo, Christian Meier and Ariadne Diaz.

In 2015, after several starring roles, he gets its first antagonistic debut since 2007, in the soap opera A que no me dejas, remake of what was in 1988 the telenovela Amor en silencio, playing Gonzalo Murat. Shares credit with Leticia Calderon, Camila Sodi, Osvaldo Benavides, Alejandra Barros, Salvador Zerboni, Alfonso Dosal and Laura Carmine.

Filmography

Films

Television

Discography 
 Mi amor anda libre (2002)
 Bésame en la boca (2004)
 Infiel (2014)
 Bandera blanca (2017)

Awards and nominations

TVyNovelas Awards

Premios ACE (New York)

Premios El Heraldo de México

Premios People en Español

References 

1962 births
Living people
Mexican male stage actors
Mexican male film actors
Mexican male telenovela actors
Male actors from Mexico City